Consafos is a four-piece indie rock band from Los Angeles, California and Omaha, Nebraska. Made up of four veteran musicians from such bands as Topeka, Ritual of Defiance, Glasscraft, and current members of Bright Eyes and The Good Life as well as Crazy Horse's Billy Talbot's son Billy Talbot Jr.

The name of the band derives from "con safos," a Chicano term meaning "with safety," used to mark graffiti. If such a piece was marked with "con safos," it was off limits, a sort of trademark, and a way of indicating that a graffito was complete and unarguable.

Discography
Such is the Way of Things EP (2004 · Greyday Productions)
Tilting at Windmills (2005 · Greyday Productions)

See also
The Good Life

References

External links
Consafos official website

Indie rock musical groups from California
Indie rock musical groups from Nebraska
Musical groups from Los Angeles
Musical groups from Omaha, Nebraska